The Dean of Bradford is the head and chair of the chapter of canons, the ruling body of Bradford Cathedral. The dean and chapter are based at the Cathedral Church of St Peter in Bradford. Before 2000 the post was designated as a provost, which was then the equivalent of a dean at most English cathedrals. The cathedral is one of three co-equal mother churches of the Diocese of Leeds and a seat of the Bishop of Leeds; until 2014 it was the mother church of the now-defunct Diocese of Bradford and as such the seat of the diocesan Bishop of Bradford.

List of deans

Provosts
1930–1931 Cecil Wilson
1933–1943 Edward Mowll
1944–1962 John Tiarks
1962–1977 Alan Cooper
1977–1989 Brandon Jackson
1990–2000 John Richardson (became Dean)

Deans
2000–2001 John Richardson (previously Provost)
2002–2004 Christopher Hancock
September 2005–May 2012 David Ison
2012–2013 Andy Williams (Acting)
201331 July 2021 (ret.): Jerry Lepine
19 June 2022present: Andy Bowerman

References

Deans of Bradford
Deans of Bradford
 
Deans of Bradford
Bradford, Dean of